The three elections that had been held after 2007 where the 2007 municipal reform took effect, had resulted in Venstre becoming the largest party solely and winning the mayor's position. 

In 2017, Venstre won 6 seats, and Henrik Hvidesten would secure a 2nd term.  

In this election, Henrik Hvidesten would seek a third term. While Venstre would once again with 6 seats with 25.9%, the Conservatives, with 25% of the vote, would also win 6 seats, marking the first time Venstre would fail to being the party that was individually the largest. Henrik Hvidesten would eventually become mayor, after a broad agreement with the Social Democrats, the Green Left and Danish People's Party was reached.

Electoral system
For elections to Danish municipalities, a number varying from 9 to 31 are chosen to be elected to the municipal council. The seats are then allocated using the D'Hondt method and a closed list proportional representation.
Ringsted Municipality had 21 seats in 2021

Unlike in Danish General Elections, in elections to municipal councils, electoral alliances are allowed.

Electoral alliances  

Electoral Alliance 1

Electoral Alliance 2

Electoral Alliance 3

Results

Notes

References 

Ringsted